Ryan William Weld (born  May 19, 1980) is a Republican member of the West Virginia Senate for the 1st district. He previously served in the West Virginia House of Delegates. He was appointed whip in 2017.

Biography
Weld was born in Wellsburg, West Virginia, where he still resides. He graduated from Fairmont State University in 2003. Weld is a prosecuting attorney and Captain in the Air Force Reserve.

Weld was elected to the House of Delegates in 2014, defeating incumbent Phil Diserio. In November 2015, he announced his candidacy for the Senate in the 2016 election. Weld won the Republican primary unopposed, and defeated incumbent Democrat Jack Yost in the general election. In 2020, Weld was unsuccessfully opposed in the primary by Jack Newbrough.

In 2018, Weld and his wife visited the House of Commons of the United Kingdom while on vacation, and sat in on Prime Minister's Questions. Weld also presented Speaker John Bercow with a copy of The West Virginia State Capitol Building, a book of photography by Thorney Lieberman.

Electoral history

References

Fairmont State University alumni
Living people
Republican Party members of the West Virginia House of Delegates
People from Wellsburg, West Virginia
West Virginia lawyers
Republican Party West Virginia state senators
21st-century American politicians
1980 births